The Bütlasse (3,193 m or 10,476 ft) is a mountain of the Bernese Alps, located north of the Gspaltenhorn in the canton of Bern. The Vorderi Bütlasse (3,063 m or 10,049 ft) is a minor summit situated north of the Bütlasse.

The closest localities are Griesalp (Kiental) and Gimmelwald (Lauterbrunnen). The Sefinenfurgge Pass, traversed by a hiking trail between Griesalp and Lauterbrunnen, passes to the north of Bütlasse.

Gallery

References

External links
 Bütlasse on Summitpost.org
 Bütlasse on Hikr

Mountains of the Alps
Alpine three-thousanders
Mountains of Switzerland
Mountains of the canton of Bern